Lam Son High School for the Gifted (Vietnamese: Trường Trung Học Phổ Thông Chuyên Lam Sơn) is a public high school in Thanh Hoa, Vietnam. Established in 1931 with the name of Collège de Thanh Hoa, the school is one of the oldest schools still operating in Vietnam and is the first high school in Thanh Hoa. The school's name has been subsequently changed to Collège de Dao Duy Tu (1943–1950), and then its current name since 1950. 
Similar to other schools for the gifted in Vietnam, Lam Son high school is the only specialized school in Thanh Hoa Province with the aim to nurture students who excelled in sciences and foreign languages.

Recognitions
Over the years, Lam Son high school has been awarded various titles and medals by the President and Prime Minister of Vietnam.
 Third-grade Labor Medal in 1989.
 Second-grade Labor Medal in 1995.
 Third-grade Independence Medal in 1999.
 Labor Hero title in 2000.

Achievements at International Science Olympiad
The following students from Lam Son high school have won medals at the International Science Olympiad.

Principals

External links

High schools in Vietnam
High schools for the gifted in Vietnam
Schools in Vietnam
Educational institutions established in 1959
1959 establishments in Vietnam